Anna Segedi (born December 19, 2000), also known by the Chinese name Zhang Xifang, is an American ice hockey player and member of the Chinese national ice hockey team,  playing with the St. Lawrence Saints women's ice hockey program in the ECAC Hockey conference of NCAA Division I.

Playing career
Born in China, Segedi grew up in Commerce Township, Michigan, a western suburb of Metro Detroit in the United States. She played minor ice hockey in the Tier 1 Elite B Hockey League (T1EBHL) with Detroit-based Honeybaked 14U from 2012 to 2014 and in the T1EHL 16U league with Belle Tire Girls Minor Midget in the 2014–15 season, ranking third in the league for scoring and leading the team to the 16U national title. Her junior career was played with Belle Tire Girls 19U in the T1EHL 19U and USA Hockey Girls Tier I 19U, with whom she won the national championship title in 2017, a national championship silver medal in 2018, a national championship bronze medal in 2019, and claimed three consecutive Michigan state titles.

NCAA
Segedi joined the St. Lawrence Saints women's ice hockey program in the ECAC Hockey conference of the NCAA Division I as a freshman in the 2019–20 season. She found success in her first month of NCAA play, scoring six goals and five assists – including a hat-trick against New Hampshire – and was named the Women’s Player of the Week for 7 October 2019 and the Women’s Rookie of the Month for October 2019 by ECAC Hockey. She concluded her rookie season ranked second of all St. Lawrence skaters in scoring, with 11 goals and 12 assists for 23 points in 36 games.

Her sophomore season continued to build on her success and saw Segedi lead the team in scoring, with four goals and eight assists for 12 points in 13 games of the COVID-19 shorted season. She was named the February 2021 Army ROTC Player of the Month by ECAC Hockey after averaging more than a point per game across the month and recording three multi-point performances.

ZhHL
Presented with the opportunity to try out for the Chinese women’s national ice hockey team at the 2022 Winter Olympics, Segedi paused her college ice hockey career and signed to play professionally with the KRS Vanke Rays in the summer of 2021. The team’s roster for 2021–22 comprised only players eligible to represent China at the upcoming Olympics, giving head coach Brian Idalski extensive time to assess individual play before building the national team. Segedi made a convincing case for her place on the national team, scoring a hat-trick against 7.62 Voskresensk and ranking third on the team for goals (fourth for points). She was named the ZhHL Rookie of the Month in September 2021.

International play
As a teen, Segedi participated in several USA Hockey Girls U18 Development Camps.

She was officially named to the Chinese roster for the women’s ice hockey tournament at the 2022 Winter Olympics on 28 January 2022.

References

External links

2000 births
Living people
American expatriate ice hockey players in China
American expatriate ice hockey players in Russia
American ice hockey left wingers
American sportspeople of Chinese descent
American women's ice hockey forwards
Chinese women's ice hockey forwards
Expatriate ice hockey players in Russia
Ice hockey players at the 2022 Winter Olympics
Olympic ice hockey players of China
People from Commerce, Michigan
St. Lawrence Saints women's ice hockey players
Shenzhen KRS Vanke Rays players